The foot plough is a type of plough used like a spade with the foot in order to cultivate the ground.

New Zealand

Scotland
Prevalent in northwest Scotland, the Scottish Gaelic language contains many terms for the various varieties, for example  'straight foot' for the straighter variety and on, but  'bent foot' is the most common variety and refers to the crooked spade. The cas-chrom went out of use in the Hebrides in the early years of the 20th century.

Describing the Scottish Highlands around 1760, Samuel Smiles wrote:The plough had not yet penetrated into the Highlands; an instrument called the cas-chrom, literally the "crooked foot"- the use of which had been forgotten for hundreds of years in every other country in Europe, was almost the only tool employed in tillage in those parts of the Highlands which were separated by almost impassable mountains from the rest of the United Kingdom.

The cas-chrom was a rude combination of a lever for the removal of rocks, a spade to cut the earth, and a foot-plough to turn it. ... It weighed about eighteen pounds.  In working it, the upper part of the handle, to which the left hand was applied, reached the workman's shoulder, and being slightly elevated, the point, shod with iron, was pushed into the ground horizontally; the soil being turned over by inclining the handle to the furrow side, at the same time making the heel act as a fulcrum to raise the point of the instrument.  In turning up unbroken ground, it was first employed with the heel uppermost, with pushing strokes to cut the breadth of the sward to be turned over; after which, it was used horizontally as above described.  We are indebted to a Parliamentary Blue Book for the following representation of this interesting relic of ancient agriculture.  It is given in the appendix to the 'Ninth Report of the Commissioners for Highland Roads and Bridges,' ordered by the House of Commons to be printed,19th April, 1821. It was an implement of tillage peculiar to the Highlands, used for turning the ground where an ordinary plough could not work on account of the rough, stony, uneven ground. It is of great antiquity and is described as follows by Armstrong:

In the Western Isles, with a foot plough, one man can perhaps do the work of four men with an ordinary spade, and while it is disadvantaged compared to a horse-plough, it is well suited to the country.

Andes

It evolved from the digging stick and combined three advantages: metal point, curved handle, and footrest. No other indigenous tool utilized the pressure of the foot in digging up the sod which made it different from all farming implements known elsewhere in the Americas in pre-Columbian times. Although  is a relatively simple instrument, it has persisted long after more sophisticated technology was introduced into the Central Andes, and its enduring presence demonstrates that more advanced innovations do not necessarily displace primitive forms that under certain conditions may be more efficient.

It probably never occurred in Southern Chile, either before or after the conquest by the Spaniards.

Pottery representations and remains of proto- tools from the Chimu culture (1300 CE) on the coast verifies its development by at least that time.

The Inca Emperor and accompanying provincial lords used foot ploughs in the "opening of the earth" ceremony at the beginning of the agricultural cycle.

 are still used by peasants farmers of native heritage in some parts of the Peruvian and Bolivian Andes. Modern  have a steel point.

See also
 Laia - the Basque h-shaped tool, also described as a foot plough.
 Lazybed, a form of agriculture
 Loy

References

External links
 Foot plough at National Museums Scotland

Agriculture in Scotland
Mechanical hand tools
Economic history of Scotland
Gardening tools
Agriculture in Peru
Agriculture in New Zealand
Ploughs